The Neumeister Collection is a compilation of 82 chorale preludes found in a manuscript copy produced by Johann Gottfried Neumeister (1757–1840). When the manuscript was rediscovered at Yale University in the 1980s it appeared to contain 31 previously unknown early chorale settings by Johann Sebastian Bach, which were added to the BWV catalogue as Nos. 1090–1120, and published in 1985.

History
Neumeister compiled his manuscript after 1790. It has been suggested that the 77 earliest works in the collection may have been copied from a single source, possibly a Bach family album put together in J. S. Bach's early years. The five works by Neumeister's own music teacher, Georg Andreas Sorge, were a later addition.

Some time after 1807 the manuscript passed to Christian Heinrich Rinck (1770–1846), whose library was bought by Lowell Mason in 1852. After Mason's death in 1873, his collection was acquired by Yale University in New Haven, Connecticut. There the Neumeister volume lay as manuscript LM 4708 until it was rediscovered "early in 1984" by musicologists Christoph Wolff (Harvard), Hans-Joachim Schulze (Bach-Archiv Leipzig), and librarian Harold E. Samuel (Yale). After satisfying themselves that the manuscript was genuine, they announced the discovery in December 1984. Their conclusions were confirmed in January 1985 by German organist  (1937–2005), who had been working on the same material independently, and with a fatal lack of urgency, since 1981. Wolff acknowledged that he brought his announcement forward when he learned that Krumbach was in the field. Krumbach was unhappy with the way things turned out.

Works and composers 
The Neumeister Collection contains 82 chorales, most of them unpublished before the 1980s re-evaluation of the Neumeister manuscript. The attribution of a few pieces in the manuscript remains uncertain:
 3 by Johann Christoph Bach (1642–1703), brother of Johann Michael and cousin of Johann Sebastian
 At least 24 by Johann Michael Bach (1648–1694), cousin and father-in-law of Johann Sebastian
 Around 38 by Johann Sebastian Bach (1685–1750)
 1 by Daniel Erich (1649–1712)
 1 or more by Johann Pachelbel (1653–1706)
 5 by Georg Andreas Sorge (1703–1778)
 1 possibly by Johann Gottfried Walther
 4 by Friedrich Wilhelm Zachow (1663–1712)
 5 unattributed works

From the state of the manuscript Wolff concludes that the five unattributed works were written by composers represented elsewhere in the collection, whose names were omitted by accident. Weighing both textual and stylistic evidence, he proposes Johann Michael Bach as the author of all five, while allowing that one could also have been written by J. S. Bach and another by Friedrich Wilhelm Zachow.

Johann Michael Bach 
The rediscovery of the Neumeister Collection quadrupled the number of keyboard works indisputably written by Johann Michael Bach, from eight to thirty-two, with six more arguably also his. Of the twenty-five pieces attributed to him in the manuscript, seven were known but had been credited to other composers and eighteen were entirely new, making this the largest single trove of his work. This remains the case even if, as some have suggested, one of the chorales that appears under his name would have been composed by Johann Heinrich Buttstett. Wolff has proposed that the five unattributed works in the volume could also be by Johann Michael Bach—confidently in three cases, less so in the other two.

Generally attributed to J. M. Bach:
 Nun komm der Heiden Heiland, 
 Meine Seele erhebt dem Herrn, 
 Herr Christ der einig Gottes Sohn, 
 Nun freut euch lieben Christen gemein (1), however also attributed to J. Pachelbel
 Nun freut euch lieben Christen gemein (2), 
 Gott hat das Evangelium (1), 
 Gott hat das Evangelium (2), 
 Gelobet seist du Jesu Christ, BWV 723, previously attributed to J. S. Bach.
 Jesus Christus unser Heiland, 
 O Herr Gott Vater in Ewigkeit, 
 Der du bist drei in Einigkeit, 
 Allein Gott in der Höh sei Ehr, 
 Mag ich Unglück nicht widerstahn, 
 Dies sind die heilgen zehn Gebot, 
 Auf meinen lieben Gott, 
 Nun laßt uns Gott dem Herren, 
 Kommt her zu mir spricht Gottes Sohn, 
 Der Herr ist mein getreuer Hirt, 
 Warum betrübst du dich mein Herz, 
 Von Gott will ich nicht lassen, 
 Ach Gott vom Himmel sieh darein, 
 Es spricht der Unweisen Mund wohl, 
 Wo Gott der Herr nicht bei uns hält, 
 Wenn mein Stündlein vorhanden ist, 

Likely by J. M. Bach:
 In dulci jubilo, BWV 751, partially attributed to J. S. Bach, possibly by J. G. Walther.

Possibly by J. M. Bach, the five anonymous preludes:
 Christ lag in Todesbanden, 
 Was mein Gott will das gescheh allzeit, 
 Ich ruf' zu dir Herr Jesu Christ (in D minor), 
 Ich ruf' zu dir Herr Jesu Christ (in G minor), 
 Heut triumphieret Gottes Sohn,

Johann Sebastian Bach 

The rediscovered manuscript prompted revisions to J. S. Bach's catalogue and reconsideration of his musical development. The collection contains 40 chorales with a BWV number:
 Nine chorales were listed in the 1950 first edition of the Bach-Werke-Verzeichnis: BWV 601, 639, 714, 719, 723, 737, 742, 751 and 957.
 31 chorales, BWV 1090–1120, were assigned a number in the 1990 second edition of the catalogue.

Two chorales of the first edition of the BWV catalogue are no longer generally associated with J. S. Bach:
 Gelobet seist du, Jesu Christ, BWV 723: although retained in the main catalogue in the 1990s editions of the Bach-Werke-Verzeichnis (not moved to the Anhang of either the doubtful or spurious works), it is often attributed to J. M. Bach, as it is in the Neumeister manuscript.
 In dulci jubilo, BWV 751: moved to BWV Anh. III (spurious works), it is attributed to J. M. Bach or J. G. Walther.

The other thirty-eight works are most often attributed to J. S. Bach, and are sometimes referred to as the Arnstädter Chorales. Five of them were already known from other sources:
 three in near-identical form:
 Herr Christ, der ein'ge Gottes Sohn (or) Herr Gott, nun sei gepreiset, BWV 601, and Ich ruf zu dir, Herr Jesu Christ, BWV 639, from the Orgelbüchlein
 Vater unser im Himmelreich, BWV 737.
 two in similar form:
 Der Tag, der ist so freudenreich, BWV 719, wrongly attributed to J. Chr. Bach. This prelude is, in part, identical to Der Tag, der ist so freudenreich, P. 85 (T. 27), by J. Pachelbel.
 Ach Herr, mich armen Sünder, BWV 742, wrongly attributed to Georg Böhm.

The other thirty-three were partly or wholly new:
 Two previously known only from fragments:
 Ach Gott und Herr, BWV 714.
 Machs mit mir, Gott, nach deiner Güt, BWV 957: the previously known part had been included as Fugue in G major in Bach's keyboard compositions.

 Thirty-one previously unknown works (BWV 1090–1120) now identified as the Neumeister Chorales Nos. 1–31 (including BWV 1096, a somewhat different version of which was known as J. Pachelbel's, from another source):
Wir Christenleut, BWV 1090
Das alte Jahr vergangen ist, BWV 1091
Herr Gott nun schleuß den Himmel auf, BWV 1092
Herzliebster Jesu, was hast du verbrochen, BWV 1093
O Jesu, wie ist deine Gestalt, BWV 1094
O Lamm Gottes, unschuldig, BWV 1095
Christe, der du bist Tag und Licht, BWV 1096, a.k.a. Wir danken dir, Herr Jesu Christ, possibly by J. Pachelbel, moved to Anh. III (the annex of the spurious works) in BWV2a (1998). The Bach Digital website lists both Bach and Pachelbel as possible composers.
Ehre sei dir, Christe, der du leidest Not, BWV 1097
Wir glauben all an einen Gott, BWV 1098
Aus tiefer Not schrei ich zu Dir, BWV 1099
Allein zu dir, Herr Jesu Christ, BWV 1100
Durch Adams Fall ist ganz verderbt, BWV 1101
Du Friedefürst, Herr Jesu Christ, BWV 1102
Erhalt uns, Herr, bei deinem Wort, BWV 1103
Wenn dich Unglück tut greifen an, BWV 1104
Jesu, meine Freude, BWV 1105
Gott ist mein Heil, mein Hilf und Trost, BWV 1106
Jesu, meines Lebens Leben, BWV 1107
Als Jesus Christus in der Nacht, BWV 1108
Ach Gott, tu dich erbarmen, BWV 1109
Oh Herre Gott, dein göttlich Wort, BWV 1110
Nun lasst uns den Leib begraben, BWV 1111
Christus, der ist mein Leben, BWV 1112
Ich hab mein Sach Gott heimgestellt, BWV 1113
Herr Jesu Christ, du höchstes Gut, BWV 1114
Herzlich lieb hab ich dich, o Herr, BWV 1115
Was Gott tut, das ist wohlgetan, BWV 1116
Alle Menschen müssen sterben, BWV 1117
Werde munter mein Gemüte, BWV 1118
Wie nach einer Wasserquelle, BWV 1119
Christ, der du bist der helle Tag, BWV 1120

The Arnstädter Chorales are considered on stylistic grounds to be early works, probably dating from 1703 to 1707, when Bach was active at Arnstadt, and possibly even earlier. They provide a new window on his formative years as a composer and cast the chorale preludes in the Orgelbüchlein, previously considered his earliest essays in the form, in a fresh light: the Orgelbüchlein pieces are not the work of a precocious beginner, but of an already practised hand.

Publication 
Wolff published the chorale preludes by J. S. Bach in 1985, and a facsimile of the complete collection in 1986.

Entire Neumeister Collection
A facsimile of the entire collection was published in 1986. In the 21st century facsimile renderings of the Neumeister manuscript became available on the Bach Digital website.

21st-century editions of Johann Sebastian Bach's Neumeister Chorales
Christoph Wolff's 2003 edition Orgelchoräle der Neumeister-Sammlung (Organ Chorales from the Neumeister Collection), Score and Critical Commentary, Volume 9 of Series IV: Organ Works of the New Bach Edition (NBA), includes 36 chorales (BWV 714, 719, 737, 742, 957 and 1090–1120). Of the 40 Neumeister chorales with a BWV number, four are not included in this edition:
 BWV 601 and 639, well-known from the Orgelbüchlein.
 BWV 723 and 751: likely not by Bach.

The NBA volume presented Bach's Neumeister Chorales in the order in which they occurred in the Neumeister manuscript. The 2018 last two volumes of Breitkopf & Härtel (B&H)'s new Urtext edition of Bach's organ works included them in alphabetical order, that is, together with other chorale preludes transmitted independently of the collections collated by the composer. The B&H edition includes 35 chorale preludes of the Neumeister Collection: apart from the four BWV numbers not adopted in the NBA edition, it additionally omits BWV 1096 (likely composed by J. Pachelbel).

Performances and recordings
The Bach chorales in the Neumeister Collection attracted the interest of organists even before they were published. They were first performed privately by Wilhelm Krumbach at Utrecht in January 1985, and publicly by John Ferris and Charles Krigbaum at Yale in March. Later the same year, Joseph Payne made the world-premiere recording for Harmonia Mundi at St. Paul's Church in Brookline, Massachusetts, working from a photostat of the Yale manuscript, and Werner Jacob made the first recording of the Wolff edition for EMI-Angel on a restored Johann Andreas Silbermann organ at Arlesheim cathedral.

Notes

References

Sources
 Sara Ann Jones. The Neumeister Collection of Chorale Preludes of the Bach Circle: An Examination of the Chorale Preludes of J.S. Bach and Their Usage as Service Music and Pedagogical Works, Doctor of Musical Arts Dissertation, Louisiana State University, 2002
 Jean M. Perreault, edited by Donna K. Fitch. The Thematic Catalogue of the Musical Works of Johann Pachelbel. Lanham, Maryland: Scarecrow Press, 2004. , 
 Russell Stinson. "Review: The Neumeister Collection of Chorale Preludes from the Bach Circle (Yale University Manuscript LM 4708) by Johann Sebastian Bach – Orgelchoräle der Neumeister-Sammlung / Organ Chorales from the Neumeister Collection by Johann Sebastian Bach, Christoph Wolff" pp. 352–361 in Journal of the American Musicological Society, Vol. 40 No. 2, Summer, 1987.
 Russell Stinson, "Some thoughts on Bach's Neumeister Chorales" in The Journal of Musicology, vol. 11, no. 4 (Autumn, 1993)
 Christoph Wolff (1991). "The Neumeister Collection of chorale preludes from the Bach circle", in Bach: Essays on His Life and Music New Haven, CT: Harvard University Press.

External links 

J.S. Bach's Neumeister Chorales performed by James Kibbie on historic German baroque organs

Baroque compositions
Compositions for organ
Chorale preludes by Johann Sebastian Bach